Herbert Scholl (12 July 1925 – 7 April 2001) was a German sailor who competed in the 1960 Summer Olympics.

References

External links
 

1925 births
2001 deaths
German male sailors (sport)
Olympic sailors of the United Team of Germany
Sailors at the 1960 Summer Olympics – 5.5 Metre